Dream is the ninth solo album from Keller Williams, released in 2007. With the help of numerous collaborators, Williams explores a wide spectrum of musical genres in each of the songs.

The album ranked number 4 on Billboard'''s Top Heatseekers chart in 2007., and the song Cadillac won the Jammy award for Song of the Year in 2008.

Track listing
All tracks by Keller Williams except where noted.

"Play This" – 2:55
"Celebrate Your Youth" (Timothy Kobza, John Molo, Bobby Read, Williams) – 3:52 with Modereko and John D'Earth"Cadillac" – 4:32 with Bob Weir"Ninja of Love" – 5:34 with Michael Franti"Kiwi and the Apricot" – 5:01 with Charlie Hunter"People Watchin' " – 5:14 with Bela Fleck, Victor Wooten, and Jeff Sipe"Cookies" – 4:51 (Fareed Haque, Williams) with Fareed Haque"Rainy Day" – 5:30 with Martin Sexton"Sing for my Dinner" – 5:09 with The String Cheese Incident"Restraint" – 4:11
"Life" – 3:57
"Twinkle" (Steve Kimock, Molo, Williams) – 7:40 with Steve Kimock and John Molo"Got No Feathers" – 5:10 with John Scofield, Victor Wooten, and Jeff Sipe"Slo Mo Balloon" – 4:34 with Fleming McWilliams and Charlie Hunter"Lil' Sexy Blues" – 3:34 with Sanjay Mishra and Samir Chatterjee"Bendix / Dance Hippie" (Williams, Ella Mae Williams) – 1:08 with Ella Williams''

Personnel 

 John Molo – drums
 John "J.T." Thomas – keyboards
 Victor Wooten – bass
 Bobby Read – clarinet, engineer, mixing, flute, saxophone
 Jim Watts – engineer
 Sanjay Mishra – classical guitar
 Samir Chatterjee – tabla
 Jeff Covert – guitar, drums, voices, vocals, editing, mixing, talk box, engineer
 Louis Gosain – engineer
 Michael Travis – mandolin, drums
 Martin Sexton – acoustic guitar, percussion, trumpet, vocals, vocal percussion, guitar
 Scott Hull – mastering
 John Painter – engineer
 Jon Altschiller – engineer, mixing
 Fleming McWilliams – vocals
 Jason Hann – percussion
 Mark Berger – design, layout design
 Dave Chalfant – bass, engineer, mixing
 Michael Kang – mandolin
 Keith Moseley – bass
 Bill Nershi – acoustic guitar
 Keller Williams – organ, banjo, bass, percussion, acoustic guitar, electric guitar, baritone guitar, 12 string electring guitar, editing, fretless bass, producer, 12 string acoustic guitar, human whistle, voices, vocals, theremin
 Kyle Hollingsworth – keyboards
 Jeff Sipe – drums
 Zac Rae – keyboards, optigan
 Derrek Phillips – drums, tambourine
 Roberto Battaglia – engineer
 Nadia Prescher – management
 Jack Mascari – engineer
 Mike McGinn – engineer
 Noel White – percussion, drums, engineer
 Scott Cresswell – engineer
 Jeremy D'Antonio – assistant Engineer
 Sandy Loeber – artwork, Photography
 Christine Stauder – management
 Jackson Hamlet Weir "Bob's Dog" – vocals
 John D'earth – trumpet
 Béla Fleck – banjo, engineer
 Michael Franti – vocals, voices, engineer
 Charlie Hunter – guitar, 8 string guitar
 Steve Kimock – electric guitar
 Tim Kobza – guitar
 Bob Weir – acoustic guitar, vocals, foot stomping, voices (His dog is barking in background of Cadillac)
 Fareed Haque – guitar, engineer, percussion, electric guitar
 John Scofield – guitar

References

2007 albums
Keller Williams albums